, abbreviated as 
, is a Japanese light novel series written by Kei Sazane and illustrated by Ao Nekonabe. Fujimi Shobo, under Kadokawa Corporation, has published fourteen volumes and three short story collections since May 2017 under their Fujimi Fantasia Bunko label. A manga adaptation by okama was serialized in Hakusensha's Young Animal magazine from May 2018 to March 2021. Both the light novel and manga are licensed in North America by Yen Press. An anime television series adaptation by Silver Link aired from October to December 2020. A second season is set to premiere in 2023.

Plot
For years, a seemingly endless war has raged between the technologically advanced Heavenly Empire and the country of powerful magic users known as the Nebulis Sovereignty. In the present day, a master swordsman from the Empire named Iska and the "Ice Calamity Witch" from Nebulis' ruling family, Aliceliese, meet on the battlefield, determined to kill each other. However, even as enemies, both harbor a secret desire to peacefully end the war between their two nations without further bloodshed. As circumstances continuously conspire to bring them together, Iska and Alice begin to wonder if they can find peace with each other at first, and through this, create a path to bring an end to this war.

Characters

Main characters

The unofficial leader of the Heavenly Empire's 907th Unit and an unparalleled swordsman who wields the black and white colored astral swords that can negate most types of magic. At the age of 16, he was recognized as the youngest Saint Disciple in the Empire's history. However, for unexplained reasons, he freed a witch who was being held in an Imperial prison, resulting in him being stripped of his title and then imprisoned for a year as punishment. Now, the leaders of the Empire have given him another chance at freedom though, provided he kills a certain purebred witch. However, Iska seeks to find a way to end the ongoing war without further bloodshed.

Aliceliese, or "Lady Alice," is the purebred "Ice Calamity Witch" with powerful ice-based magic that rivals most other astral mages in her homeland of the Nebulis Sovereignty. As a daughter of the Nebulis royal family, Alice is in line for the throne that Millavair, the current queen and her mother, currently inhabits. After running into Iska multiple times, she starts to develop feelings for him, and even makes an attempt to recruit him to her cause. Like Iska, she quietly seeks to end the war between the two countries without further bloodshed as well. However, these ideals raise tensions with her mother, who sees no path to peace with the Empire, even going as far as burning artwork in her personal room that was made within the Empire.

Heavenly Empire

A skilled sharpshooter with the 907th Unit who usually speaks in a dry tone.

Captain of the 907th Unit. Despite looking like a child, acting like a klutz, and having low physical strength, she still provides moral support to her comrades in the Unit. Later on, she gets exposed to a star vortex and is branded as an astral mage. Though her powers are currently unknown, the rest of the Unit is forced to hide her brand lest she be experimented on by the Empire.

A high-spirited field mechanic and weapons designer in the 907th Unit who creates and deploys anti-magic equipment during missions.

The fifth seat of the Saint Disciples. 

An assassin who is the eighth seat of the Saint Disciples.

The captain of the 104th Unit. She is a friend of Mismis.

The emperor of the Empire.

Nebulis Sovereignty

Alice's personal maid and bodyguard who has served her from early childhood. In addition to her physical and martial prowess, Rin is a powerful astral mage who uses earth-based magic to create golems.

Alice's younger sister who was held captive in the Empire until Iska freed her one year prior to the start of the story. She has a psychometric-style ability called "Lamplight," where she can see things that happened up to 200 years in the past, within 3 kilometers (about 2 miles) around her. She believes there is a threat to her family that only Iska can help her with.

Queen of the Nebulis Sovereignty.

Alice and Sisbell's older sister.

The acting head of the Zoa family.

A purebred member of the Zoa family. She has the power to deconstruct and reconstruct matter.

The founder of the Nebulis Sovereignty.

Other characters

The former wielder of the astral swords who is Iska and Jhin's mentor.

A criminal who is imprisoned for attacking the previous queen.

Media

Light novel
Our Last Crusade or the Rise of a New World is written by Kei Sazane and illustrated by Ao Nekonabe. The first light novel volume was published on May 20, 2017, by Fujimi Shobo under their Fujimi Fantasia Bunko imprint. As of December 2022, fourteen volumes and three short story collections have been published. Yen Press has acquired the license for the series in North America and published the first volume on September 24, 2019.

Manga
A manga adaptation of the series by okama was serialized in Hakusensha's Young Animal magazine from May 11, 2018, to March 12, 2021. Seven tankōbon volumes were published from December 26, 2018, to April 28, 2021. Yen Press also licensed the manga for North American release, and the first volume was released on November 5, 2019.

Anime
An anime television series adaptation was announced at the "Fantasia Bunko Dai Kanshasai 2019" event on October 20, 2019. The series was animated by Silver Link and directed by Shin Ōnuma and Mirai Minato, with Kento Shimoyama handling series composition and Kaori Sato as character designer and chief animation director. Seima Iwahashi, Ryōta Tomura, and Ryūichirō Fujinaga of Elements Garden composed the series' music. The series aired from October 7 to December 23, 2020, on AT-X and other channels. Kaori Ishihara performed the opening theme "Against.", while Sora Amamiya performed the ending theme . 

Funimation acquired the series and streamed it on its website in North America and Britain and Ireland, and on AnimeLab in Australia and New Zealand. On October 27, 2020, Funimation announced that the series would receive an English dub, which premiered the following day. Following Sony's acquisition of Crunchyroll, the series was moved to Crunchyroll.

On October 1, 2021, it was announced that a sequel had been green-lit. It was later revealed to be a second season that is set to premiere in 2023.

Episode list

See also
Gods' Games We Play, another light novel series by the same author

Notes and references

External links
  
  
 

2017 Japanese novels
Anime and manga based on light novels
AT-X (TV network) original programming
Crunchyroll anime
Fantasy anime and manga
Fujimi Fantasia Bunko
Hakusensha manga
Japanese fantasy novels
Kadokawa Dwango franchises
Light novels
Romance anime and manga
Seinen manga
Silver Link
Upcoming anime television series
Yen Press titles